The ePodsOne (EP1) was an internet appliance from ePods.com (Salton) from the dot-com bubble era that lives on as a hacked platform.  ePods.com was founded in 1999; the company and the EP1 was discontinued in 2000.  The EP1 was described as:

 Compact and light Internet appliance, about the size of a magazine
 Requires only power and a phone line
 256-color, 8.2-inch, 640 x 480 LCD touch screen controlled by stylus; also includes onscreen keyboard
 Customized Internet content and 5 e-mail accounts ($24.99 monthly service)
 129 MHz, 32-bit RISC processor, 16 MB RAM, 56kbit/s modem, rechargeable NiMH battery,
 PCMCIA Slot II port, 2 USB ports, a serial port, IrDA 1.1 port, internal microphone, headphone and microphone jacks
 Windows CE operating system
 2.2 pounds
 Partnered with Google for search
 Originally $199 (retail)

Reviews
 Bloomberg BusinessWeek's ePodsOne: An Internet Appliance That Shows Promise.
 EdgeReview's Internet Anywhere, For Cheap (archived webpage)
 The Seattle Times The `e' in ePods? It stands for `easy'

References

Computer-related introductions in 1999
Products and services discontinued in 2000
Tablet computers